"The Least You Can Do" is a song by English singer Phil Collins. Originally released on his seventh solo album Testify (2002), it was issued in 2003 with "Wake Up Call" as a double A-side single.

The song was written and arranged with Daryl Stuermer, who also provided the arrangement for other songs in Collins' career, such as "Something Happened on the Way to Heaven".

Track listing
UK single

"The Least You Can Do" – 4:23
"Wake Up Call" – 4:14
"Hey, Now Sunshine" – 5:02

European single

"The Least You Can Do" – 4:23
"Easy Lover" (live) – 5:02
"You Touch My Heart" - 4:42

Credits 
 Phil Collins – vocals, drums, percussion 
 Jamie Muhoberac – keyboards
 Daryl Stuermer – lead guitar
 Tim Pierce – rhythm guitar
 Paul Bushnell – bass
 Eric Rigler – Uilleann pipes
 Arranged by Phil Collins and Daryl Stuermer

Charts

References

External links

2003 singles
Phil Collins songs
Songs written by Phil Collins
Song recordings produced by Phil Collins
Song recordings produced by Rob Cavallo
Songs written by Daryl Stuermer